Fernando Schwartz (born 1937 in Geneva) is a Spanish writer.

As the son of diplomats and a diplomat for 25 years he has lived in several countries. He was Spanish Ambassador in Kuwait and the Netherlands and spokesman of foreign policy until 1988.

He worked later for PRISA group as councillor, spokesman and communication in chief of El País newspaper. He has been professor of Opinion in UAM journalism department and conductor of TV program Lo más Plus in Canal Plus. He lives currently between Madrid and Majorca with his family.

Partial bibliography
El cuenco de laca, 2008
Vichy 1940, 2006
Cambio dos de veinticinco por una de cincuenta, 2002
Educación y descanso. Las anécdotas de la diplomacia, 2000
El engaño de Beth Loring, 2000
El desencuentro, 1996
La venganza, 1988
La conspiración del Golfo, 1982
La internacionalización de la guerra civil española, 1971

Prizes
Premio Primavera de Novela. 2006
Premio Planeta 1996
Finalista a Premio Planeta 1982

References

External links

1937 births
Living people
Spanish male writers
Ambassadors of Spain to the Netherlands
Ambassadors of Spain to Kuwait